Polychronis is a masculine Greek given name Πολυχρόνης. Notable people with the name include:

Polychronis Lembesis (1848–1913), Greek painter
Polychronis Tzortzakis (born 1989), Greek cyclist
Polychronis Vezyridis (born 1974), Greek footballer

Greek masculine given names